
Peter of Hispania (Portuguese and ;  century) was the author of the , later known as the , an important medieval university textbook on Aristotelian logic. As the Latin Hispania was considered to include the entire Iberian Peninsula, he is traditionally and usually identified with the medieval Portuguese scholar and ecclesiastic Peter Juliani, who was elected Pope John XXI in 1276. He is also sometimes identified as Petrus Ferrandi Hispanus ( 1254  1259).

Life

Philosophical works
The most recent edition is Peter of Hispania (Petrus Hispanus Portugalensis), Tractatus called afterwards Summule Logicales, edited by Lambertus Marie de Rijk, Wijsgerige Teksten en Studies 22 (Assen: Van Gorcum, 1972). A later logical work of his is, in the most recent edition, Peter of Hispania (Petrus Hispanus Portugalensis), Syncategoreumata, edited by Lambertus Marie de Rijk and translated by Joke Spruyt, Studien und Text zur Geistesgeschichte des Mittelalters 30 (New York: E. J. Brill, 1992).

Peter of Hispania supported an investigation of teaching at the University of Paris which resulted in the Parisian bishop's Condemnation of 1277, which denounced Aristotelian propositions which conflicted with church doctrine.
Dialectica est ars artium, scientia scientiarum, ad omnium methodorum principia viam habens; sola enim dialectica probabiliter disputat de principiis omnium aliarum scientiarum, et ideo in acquisitione omnium aliarum scientiarum dialectica debet esse prior. "Dialectic [that is, logic, in Peter's terminology] is the art of arts, science of sciences, having the way to the principles of all methods; for in fact dialectic alone credibly argues about the principles of all other sciences, and therefore in [one's] acquisition (learning) of all other sciences dialectic must be prior." — Peter of Hispania.

Medical works

A Petrus Hispanus, usually identified as the same scholar, was also credited as the author of a Commentary on Isaac, one of the foundational texts of clinical pharmacology. A Pedro Hispano was also credited with the Treasury of The Poor, a comprehensive medical manual of diseases and remedies.

English translations
 Peter of Spain Summaries of Logic, Text, Translation, Introduction, and Notes by Brian P. Copenhaver, Calvin G. Normore, Terence Parsons, New York, Oxford University Press, 2014. Another translation of Peter's Tractatus (=Summule Logicales) is Francis P. Dinneen, trans., Language in Dispute: An English Translation of Peter of Spain’s Tractatus called afterwards Summulae Logicales, ed. L. M. De Rijk, Studies in the History of the Language Sciences, vol. 39, Amsterdam Studies in the Theory and History of Linguistic Science 3 (Philadelphia: John Benjamins Publishing Company, 1990).

References

External links

 Peter of Spain, Thesaurus Pauperum in Italian, Manuscript, ca. 1300-1320, at the Library of Congress

Medieval Spanish physicians
Spanish science writers
Logicians
Scholastic philosophers
13th-century Latin writers
Spanish philosophers
Textbook writers
13th-century physicians
13th-century philosophers